Busytown Mysteries, also known as Hurray for Huckle!, is a Canadian animated television series created by Cookie Jar Entertainment. Currently, the series airs in Canada as part of the Kids' CBC block and on the Tiny Pop channel in the United Kingdom. In the United States, the show was originally going to be on Qubo, but it aired as part of the Cookie Jar TV block on CBS instead, and then returned to the United States on Starz.

Season one was directed by Ken Cunningham and produced by Christine Davis. Animation for season one was produced by Helix Digital inc. Post production was handled by Fearless Films and Supersonics Productions inc. Season one was the winner of the 2009 CFTPA award for best children's program, and nominated for the 2009 Pulcinella award for best preschool series at Italy's prestigious "Cartoons on the Bay".

Season two was directed by Larry Jacobs with post directing by Ken Cunningham and produced by Genna Du Plessis, and Audrey Velichka.

Overview 
The show takes place in Richard Scarry's Busytown and teaches the scientific method through stories in which Huckle Cat (with his sister Sally Cat, and friend Lowly Worm) solve mysteries by examining evidence, with occasional help from friends such as Hilda Hippo, and twins Pig Will and Pig Won't. The mysteries are filed through insect reporter Gold Bug, who comes with a microphone and his own personal news van.

Voice cast
 Joanne Vannicola as Huckle Cat, Sally's older brother and the leader of his detective group. Huckle is the most mature, observative and intelligent of his group, though he isn't above childish behavior. He drives a red car with a picture of his face on the hood. 
 Ellie Ellwand as Sally Cat, Huckle's younger sister. Sally is much more immature than her brother, but she is always on his side. She rides a red scooter and wears a matching helmet doing so.
 Paul Wensley as Lowly Worm, a friend of Huckle and Sally's. Lowly is easygoing and has a bit of a joking spree, often disguising himself as a long and thin object. A running gag in the series is Lowly's penchant for sneezing when near something he's allergic to (often a flower). He drives a red car shaped like an apple.
 Julie Lemieux as Pig Will, Pig Won't's twin, and a friend of Huckle's. Pig Will is cheery and optimistic, and although he and his brother mean well, their penchant for ridiculous theories, focus on food, and constant arguments often serve as a common source of the group's annoyances. He and his twin share a truck with a cab shaped like a sausage. Pig Will is identified by his straight ears, green shirt, and higher-pitched voice.
 Lemieux also voices Hilda Hippo, a friend of Huckle's. Hilda enjoys numerous activities most consider feminine, and is typically seen bonding the most with Sally. She has numerous activities and drives a pink and purple buggy. 
 Richard Binsley as Pig Won't, Pig Will's twin, and a friend of Huckle's. Pig Won't is grumpy and pessimistic, and although he and his brother mean well, their penchant for ridiculous theories, focus on food, and constant arguments often serve as a common source of the group's annoyances. He and his twin share a truck with a cab shaped like a sausage. Pig Won't is identified by his bent ears, red shirt, and lower-pitched voice.
 Kevin Dennis as Goldbug, Busytown's main reporter. He is often around when there is a mystery around, but he also does reports on key events all over Busytown. He uses a large variety of small orange vehicles, namely a news van, helicopter, and occasionally a boat.

Episodes
Each of the following episodes consists of two cartoons.

Pilot (2004)
Ep0 The Missing Balloons Mystery  (June 4, 2004)

Season 1 (2007)

Season 2 (2009–2010)

Home releases
Between 2009-2010, NCircle Entertainment released several DVD releases of the series in the United States. The first two releases: "The Very Best Busytown Friends Ever!" and "Zooming Around Busytown" were released on February 10, 2009. The third: "The Best Outside Fun Ever!" was released on June 30, 2009. All three of these releases were released under the show's alternate title: Hurray for Huckle!. The last two releases: "A Pickle of a Pickle in Busytown", released on May 25, 2010, and  "The Mysterious Mysteries Of Busytown", released on July 13, 2010, were released under the show's original title.

On July 27, 2010, Mill Creek Entertainment released a DVD called You and Me Solve a Mystery, a 3-disc set featuring the entire second season of the series on DVD, once again in the United States. Similar to other Cookie Jar releases from Mill Creek, the set also contains a bonus episode of The Busy World of Richard Scarry alongside four other Cookie Jar shows: Wimzie's House, A Miss Mallard Mystery, Nellie the Elephant and Simon in the Land of Chalk Drawings. The company also released the first disc as a standalone release on the same day, titled "The Biggest Mysteries Ever!", containing the same bonus episode of The Busy World of Richard Scarry.

References

External links

 
 Busytown Mysteries at Big Cartoon Database

2000s Canadian animated television series
2010s Canadian animated television series
2000s Canadian children's television series
2010s Canadian children's television series
2007 Canadian television series debuts
2010 Canadian television series endings
Canadian children's animated fantasy television series
Canadian children's animated mystery television series
Canadian preschool education television series
Animated preschool education television series
2000s preschool education television series
2010s preschool education television series
CBC Kids original programming
Television series by Cookie Jar Entertainment
Television series by DHX Media
Canadian flash animated television series
Canadian television shows based on children's books
Animated television series about cats
Animated television series about children
Animated television series about pigs
Animated television series about siblings
English-language television shows